Begonia nelumbiifolia, the lilypad begonia, is a species of flowering plant in the family Begoniaceae.

References

Cham. & Schltdl., Linnaea 5: 604 (1830).

nelumbiifolia